Nebojša Skopljak (born 12 May 1987) is a Serbian professional footballer who plays as a defender for Proleter Novi Sad.

External links
 

1987 births
Living people
Serbian expatriate footballers
Serbian footballers
Association football defenders
Footballers from Belgrade
Serbia under-21 international footballers
AEZ Zakakiou players
Ayia Napa FC players
FK Mornar players
FK Novi Pazar players
RFK Novi Sad 1921 players
FK Proleter Novi Sad players
FK Radnički Pirot players
FK Timok players
Kecskeméti TE players
OFK Beograd players
OFK Grbalj players
FK TSC Bačka Topola players
Serbian First League players
Serbian SuperLiga players
Montenegrin First League players
Nemzeti Bajnokság I players
Cypriot First Division players
Serbian expatriate sportspeople in Cyprus
Serbian expatriate sportspeople in Hungary
Serbian expatriate sportspeople in Montenegro
Expatriate footballers in Cyprus
Expatriate footballers in Hungary
Expatriate footballers in Montenegro